Ben Thomas (born 10 December 1997) is an Australian professional rugby league footballer who plays as a  for the Sydney Roosters in the NRL (National Rugby League).

Background
He played his junior rugby league for the Kincumber Colts.

Playing career
Thomas played under 20s for the Sydney Roosters in 2016 and 2017. Ben started in the front row in the Sydney Roosters 2016 Holden Cup premiership winning side that beat the Penrith Panthers 30–28.

Thomas played for the Wyong Roos, Newcastle and North Sydney in the NSW Cup.

In round 14 of the 2021 NRL season, Thomas made his first grade debut for the Sydney Roosters against the Gold Coast.

References

External links
Sydney Roosters profile
North Sydney Bears profile

1997 births
Living people
Australian rugby league players
North Sydney Bears NSW Cup players
Sydney Roosters players
Rugby league players from New South Wales
Rugby league props